Bavayia loyaltiensis is a species of geckos endemic to New Caledonia.

References

Bavayia
Reptiles described in 2022
Taxa named by Aaron M. Bauer
Taxa named by Ross Allen Sadlier
Geckos of New Caledonia